Bernd Wittenburg  (born 1 April 1950 in Neukloster) is a former East German middleweight boxer who competed at the 1976 Montreal Olympics and who won titles for the SC Dynamo Berlin / Sportvereinigung (SV) Dynamo. He won the GDR Championships in boxing in 1972, 1973, 1974, 1975 and 1976.

1976 Olympic results
 Round of 32: defeated Bryan Gibson (Canada) by a third-round knockout
 Round of 16: lost to Luis Martínez (Cuba) by decision, 2-3

References

External links 
 

1950 births
Living people
Middleweight boxers
German male boxers
Olympic boxers of East Germany
Boxers at the 1976 Summer Olympics
AIBA World Boxing Championships medalists
People from Nordwestmecklenburg